Flexitarianism or flexitarism is a semi-vegetarian diet in which people do not eat meat one or more days a week. 

A semi-vegetarian diet (SVD), also called a flexitarian, is one that is centered on plant foods with limited inclusion of meat. Flexitarian is a portmanteau of the words flexible and vegetarian, signifying its followers' less strict diet pattern when compared to vegetarian pattern diets.

Definitions 
Different definitions of flexitarianism are used. According to the Dutch environmental organisation Natuur & Milieu, a flexitarian eats no meat, fish or lunch meat for at least one day a week. The Dutch research agency I&O Research calls people flexitarian when they do not eat meat one or more days a week. The Dutch Food Health authority Voedingscentrum states that flexitarians do not eat meat (but do eat fish) three or more days a week in between or with a hot meal.

Vegetarianism is the strict practice of abstaining from consuming meat or any other animal tissue. Flexitarianism is a neoteric term that gained a considerable increase in usage in both science and public sectors in the 2010s. Flexitarian was listed in the mainstream Merriam-Webster's Collegiate Dictionary in 2012. In 2003, the American Dialect Society voted flexitarian as the year's most useful word.

Other neologisms used as synonyms for semi-vegetarianism are demi-vegetarianism, reducetarianism and semi-veganism.

Developments 
In 2015, according to the Voedingscentrum, 55% of Dutch people were flexitarians. According to Natuur & Milieu, in 2016, 67% of the Dutch were flexitarian. According to research by Wageningen University & Research, the number of Dutch people who call themselves flexitarians increased from 14% in 2011 to 43% in 2019. However, the number of days that self-proclaimed flexitarians ate meat increased over that period from 2.9 days a week to 3.7 days. The researchers suspected that this was mainly due to the inflation of this term among the Dutch.

According to a study by LEI Wageningen UR, the proportion of Dutch people who eat meat daily decreased from 26.7% to 18.4% between 2010 and 2012. According to a study by Dutch research agency Motivaction at the beginning of June 2012, reducing meat consumption is a conscious choice for 35% of the Dutch. 14.8% of the population ate meat no more than one or two days a week.
In Flanders, 1 in 6 people in 2013 do not eat meat one or more days a week. A quarter opts for a meat-free day at least once a month.

In 2003, the American Dialect Society chose the word flexitarian as the most useful word of the year.

Motivations 
Common reasons for adopting a semi-vegetarian diet include religious restrictions, weight management, health consciousness, issues relating to animal welfare or animal rights (see ethical omnivorism), the environment (see environmental vegetarianism), or reducing resource use (see economic vegetarianism). Flexitarians may have attitudes and endorsement behavior concerning health issues, humanitarianism, and animal welfare.

Varieties
The main fundamental of some specific semi-vegetarian diets is about the inflexible adherence to a diet that omits multiple classes and types of animals from the diet in entirety, rather than a sole focus on reduction in consumption frequency. Some examples include:

Demitarianism: the practice of making a conscious effort to reduce meat consumption largely for environmental reasons. The term was devised in October 2009 in Barsac, France at the combined workshop of Nitrogen in Europe (NinE) and Biodiversity in European Grasslands: Impacts of Nitrogen (BEGIN) where they developed "The Barsac Declaration: Environmental Sustainability and the Demitarian Diet".
Pescetarian diet: someone who follows this diet eats fish and/or shellfish and may or may not consume dairy and eggs. The consumption of meat, such as poultry, mammal meat and the flesh of any other animal is abstained from. In the past, some vegetarian societies used to consider it to simply be a less-strict type of vegetarianism. This is no longer the case now that modern day vegetarian societies object to the consumption of all fish and shellfish.
Pollotarian diet: someone who follows this diet eats chicken and/or other poultry and usually eggs as well. A pollotarian would not consume seafood, the meat from mammals, or other animals often for environmental, health or food justice reasons.
Macrobiotic diet: a plant-based diet that may include occasional fish or other seafood. Cereals, especially brown rice, are the staples of the macrobiotic diet, supplemented by small amounts of vegetables and occasionally fish. Some advocates of the macrobiotic diet promote a vegetarian (or nearly vegan) approach as the ideal.
Planetary health diet: dietary paradigms that have the following aims: to feed a growing world's population, to greatly reduce the worldwide number of deaths caused by poor diet, and to be environmentally sustainable as to prevent the collapse of the natural world.

Dietary pattern 

All semi-vegetarians could accurately be described as people who eat a plant-based diet, but there is no firm consensus how infrequently someone would have to eat meat and fish for their diet to be considered a semi-vegetarian diet rather than a regular plant-based diet. 

Recurring conditions of a semi-vegetarian include consuming red meat or poultry only once a week. One study defined semi-vegetarians as consuming meat or fish three days a week. Occasionally, researchers define semi-vegetarianism as eschewing red meat in entirety and flexitarianism as the distinct practice of eating very little meat. Semi-vegetarianism/flexitarianism may be the default diet for much of the world, where meals based on plant materials provide the bulk of people's regular energy intake. In many countries, this is often due to financial barriers as higher incomes are associated with diets rich in animal and dairy proteins rather than carbohydrate based staples. One estimate is that 14% of the global population is flexitarian.

Society and culture

In the United Kingdom, there was increased demand for vegan products in 2018. A 2018 study estimated that the amount of UK consumers following a "meat-free diet" had increased to 12%, including 6% vegetarians, 4% pescetarians and 2% vegans. A 2018 poll indicated that 10% of adult Canadians considered themselves as vegetarians or vegans, among whom 42% were young adults. 

In 2019, an international group stated that the adoption of the flexitarian diet would "save lives, feed 10 billion people and all without causing catastrophic damage to the planet," when compared to the current western diet.

The term flexitarian has been criticized by some vegetarians and vegans as an oxymoron because people following the diet are not vegetarians but omnivores as they still consume the flesh of animals.

See also 
Meat-free days
Meatless Monday
Dawn Jackson Blatner

Sources 

Semi-vegetarianism